The 1977–78 season of the European Cup football club tournament was won by defending champions Liverpool in the final against Brugge. The match finished 1–0, starting a run of six consecutive finals that finished 1–0 after 90 minutes, five of them won by English clubs.

Bracket

First round

|}

First leg

Second leg

Celtic won 11–1 on aggregate.

Wacker won 3–2 on aggregate.

Red Star Belgrade won 6–0 on aggregate.

Borussia Mönchengladbach won 4–1 on aggregate.

0–0 on aggregate; Benfica won on penalties.

Boldklubben 1903 won 2–1 on aggregate.

Dynamo Dresden won 3–2 on aggregate.

Levski-Spartak won 5–2 on aggregate.

Ajax won 4–2 on aggregate.

Glentoran won 2–1 on aggregate.

Juventus won 5–0 on aggregate.

Club Brugge won 9–2 on aggregate.

Panathinaikos won 5–1 on aggregate.

1–1 on aggregate; Nantes won on away goals.

Atlético Madrid won 3–2 on aggregate.

Second round

|}

First leg

Second leg

Wacker won 4–2 on aggregate.

Borussia Mönchengladbach won 8–1 on aggregate.

Benfica won 2–0 on aggregate.

Liverpool won 6–3 on aggregate.

Ajax won 4–2 on aggregate.

Juventus won 6–0 on aggregate.

Club Brugge won 2–1 on aggregate.

Atlético Madrid won 3–2 on aggregate.

Quarter-finals

|}

First leg

Second leg

3–3 on aggregate; Borussia Mönchengladbach won on away goals.

Liverpool won 6–2 on aggregate.

2–2 on aggregate; Juventus won 3–0 on penalties.

Club Brugge won 4–3 on aggregate.

Semi-finals

|}

First leg

Second leg

Liverpool won 4–2 on aggregate.

Club Brugge won 2–1 on aggregate.

Final

Top scorers

References

External links
1977–78 All matches – season at UEFA website
European Cup results at Rec.Sport.Soccer Statistics Foundation
All scorers 1977–78 European Cup according to protocols UEFA
1977/78 European Cup - results and line-ups (archive)

1977–78 in European football
European Champion Clubs' Cup seasons